King John is the title by which the earliest known example of a film based on a play by William Shakespeare is commonly known.

Filmed in London, England, in September 1899, at the British Mutoscope and Biograph Company's open-air studio on the Embankment, it was a silent film made from four very short separate films. Each of those films showed a heavily edited scene from Herbert Beerbohm Tree's forthcoming stage production of Shakespeare's mid-1590s play, King John, at Her Majesty's Theatre London.

The first film was of The Temptation Scene with John, Hubert, and Arthur, the second of The Lamentation Scene with Constance, Philip of France, Lewis, and Pandulph, the third of King John's Dying Scene with John, Henry, Pembroke, and Salisbury, and the fourth of King John's Death Scene with John, Henry, Falconbridge, Pembroke, and Salisbury.
 
The filming of King John was produced and directed by William Kennedy Laurie Dickson and Walter Pfeffer Dando. The acting and production design was by Herbert Tree, the cinematography was by William Dickson, and the  production company was the British Mutoscope and Biograph Company.

Surviving copies
The EYE Film Institute Nederland has an incomplete copy of the third film lasting just under one minute. The last seconds of the scene are missing from the EYE copy; the BFI National Archive has a film clip of a few frames of the missing part.

Preserved still frames
The below still frames from the film were published in the 27 September 1899 issue of The Sketch accompanying a review of Tree's stage production. While these were known to scholars ever since Robert Hamilton Ball's Shakespeare On Silent Film (1968), and preceding journal papers, they were assumed to be ordinary production stills from the stage adaptation. It was not until B. A. Kachur's paper "The First Shakespeare Film: A Reconsideration and Reconstruction of Tree's King John" (1991) in Theatre Survey that they were identified as still frames from the film.

Cast

Herbert Beerbohm Tree as King John
Dora Senior as Prince Henry
Charles Sefton as Prince Arthur
James Fisher as Earl of Pembroke
S. A. Cookson as Earl of Salisbury
Franklyn McLeay as Hubert de Burgh
Lewis Waller as Philip Faulconbridge
Julia Neilson as Constance
William Mollison as Philip, King of France
Gerald Lawrence as Lewis, The Dauphin
Louis Calvert as Cardinal Pandulph

Notes and references

Sources

Further reading
Anonymous King John Souvenir | Shakespeare's Historical Drama King John | Her Majesty's Theatre. London, England, British Mutoscope & Bioscope Company, 1899 [Theatre Programme].
Barnes, John The Beginnings Of The Cinema In England 1894-1901 | Volume Five: 1900. Exeter, England, Exeter University Press, 1997. 
McKernan, Luke & Terris, Olwen Walking Shadows | Shakespeare In The National Film And Television Archive. London, England, British Film Institute, 1994. 
McKernan, Luke A Scene - King John - Now Playing At Her Majesty's Theatre in: Fitzsimmons, Linda & Street, Sarah Moving Performances | British Stage & Screen 1890s-1920s. Trowbridge, England, Flick Books, 1999.

External links

 IMDb: King John (1899) 

1899 films
Articles containing video clips
British silent short films
Films based on King John (play)
Cultural depictions of John, King of England
British black-and-white films
1899 short films
British films based on plays
Films shot in London
1890s British films